Bodiu is a Romanian surname. Notable people with the surname include:

Andrei Bodiu (1965–2014), Romanian poet, literary commentator, Professor of Literature and publicist
Filimon Bodiu (died 1950), Moldovan activist and anti-communist
Olimpiada Bodiu (1912–1971), Moldovan activist and anti-communist
Victor Bodiu (born 1971), Moldovan politician

Romanian-language surnames